The Departmental Council of Haut-Rhin was the deliberative assembly of the French department of Haut-Rhin. It included 34 departmental councillors from the 17 cantons of Haut-Rhin. Its headquarters were in Colmar.

It was replaced, together with the departmental council of Bas-Rhin, by the assembly of Alsace on January 1, 2021, following the creation of the European Collectivity of Alsace. The members of the departmental council of Haut-Rhin kept their mandate within the new assembly of Alsace.

List of presidents 
The last president of the Council was Rémy With (DVD) elected in 2020, following Brigitte Klinkert's appointment as Minister delegate for Integration.

Vice-presidents 
The president of the departmental council is assisted by 10 vice-presidents, chosen among the departmental councillors. Each has a delegation of authority.

References 

Haut-Rhin
Politics of Alsace
Haut-Rhin